The 1966–67 Roller Hockey Champions Cup was the 2nd edition of the Roller Hockey Champions Cup organized by CERH.

Reus Deportiu achieved their first title ever.

Teams
The champions of the main European leagues, and Voltregà as title holders, played this competition, consisting in a double-legged knockout tournament.

Bracket

Source:

References

External links
 CERH website

1966 in roller hockey
1967 in roller hockey
Rink Hockey Euroleague